Ronnie Wood Anthology: The Essential Crossexion is the first solo compilation of Ronnie Wood, which includes solo work and music from Wood's bands The Birds, The Creation, Jeff Beck Group, The Faces and The Rolling Stones.

Track listing

CD 1 
 "I Can Feel the Fire" (Ronnie Wood)
 "Cancel Everything" (Wood)
 "Far East Man" (George Harrison, Wood)
 Tracks 1-3 Album: I've Got My Own Album To Do
 "Big Bayou" (Gib Gilbeau)
 "If You Don't Want My Love" (Bobby Womack)
 Tracks 4-5 Album: Now Look
 "1234" (Wood)
 "Fountain of Love" (Wood)
 Tracks 6-7 Album: 1234
 "Seven Days" (Bob Dylan)
 Track 8 Album: The 30th Anniversary Concert Celebration
 "Always Wanted More" (Wood, Bernard Fowler)
 "Breathe on Me" (Wood)
 "Somebody Else Might" (Wood, Fowler)
 "Josephine" (Wood, Fowler)
 Tracks 9-12 Album: Slide On This
 "Testify" (George Clinton, Deron Taylor)
 Track 13 Album: Slide on Live: Plugged in and Standing
 "Whadd'ya Think" (Wood)
 "This Little Heart" (Wood)
 Tracks 14-15 Album: Not for Beginners
 "Little Mixed Up" (Wood)
 "You Strum and I'll Sing" (Wood)
 Tracks 16-17 Previously unreleased

CD 2 
 "You're on My Mind"
 "You Don't Love Me (You Don't Care)" (Ellas McDaniel)
 "No Good Without You Baby"
 "How Can It Be"
 Tracks 1-4 Artist: The Birds
 "Midway Down"
 "Girls Are Naked"
 Tracks 5 & 6 Artist: The Creation
 "I Ain't Superstitious"
 "All Shook Up"
 "Plynth (Water Down the Drain)"
 "Jailhouse Rock"
 Tracks 7-10 Artist: Jeff Beck Group
 "Flying"
 "Gasoline Alley"
 "Miss Judy's Farm"
 "Too Bad"
 "Maggie May"
 "Stay with Me"
 "Every Picture Tells a Story"
 Tracks 12-15-17 Artist: Rod Stewart
 "Ooh La La"
 Tracks 11-13-14-16-18 Artist: The Faces
 "Everything Is Turning to Gold"
 "Black Limousine"
 Tracks 19 & 20 Artist: The Rolling Stones

References

Ronnie Wood albums
2006 compilation albums